XHW-FM is a music radio station branded as Alegría Mexicana in La Paz, Baja California Sur. It is owned by the Raúl Arechiga Espinoza interests.

History
XHW received its concession on April 23, 1964, making it the first FM radio station in Baja California Sur. It broadcast with 250 watts and was owned by Radio La Paz, S.A., a company controlled by BCS radio and television pioneer Francisco King Rondero. By 1986, it broadcast with 880 watts.

In the 1980s, XHW was sold to Promomedios California, the radio group of the Raúl Arechiga Espinoza interests.

References

Regional Mexican radio stations
Spanish-language radio stations
Radio stations in La Paz, Baja California Sur